Alsény Këïta Kamolosilah (born 26 June 1983), also known as Al Husein Keita, is a Liberian former professional footballer who played as a midfielder. Born and raised in Guinea, he played for Guinea's youth and  senior level national teams. In 2011 however, Këïta switched to the Liberia national football team.

Club career
Born in Massanta, Guinea, Këïta began his career with Horoya AC. In 2000, he joined Moroccan club FUS Rabat, where he played one year before signing for SC Chabab Mohammedia. After two seasons there he signed with FC Luzern in July 2003.

In July 2006, after two years with FC Luzern Këïta joined CFA team Gazélec Ajaccio. After one year with Ajaccio, he signed for US Sénart-Moissy in summer 2007. In summer 2009 he joined Guinean club Satellite FC on loan for half year before returning to Sénart-Moissy in January 2010.

International career
Këïta was a part of the Guinean squad at the 2004 Olympic Games qualification tournament. He later represented Liberia at international level, also captaining the side.

Personal life
Alsény is the twin brother of professional Guinean footballer Alhassane Keita.

Honors

 Guinée Championnat National: 2000
 CAF Cup: runner-up 2001
 Botola: 2002
 Moroccan Player of the Year: 2002
 Swiss Cup: runner-up 2005

References

External links
 

1988 births
Living people
Guinean twins
Liberian twins
Twin sportspeople
Identical twins
Association football midfielders
Liberian footballers
Liberia international footballers
Guinean footballers
Dual internationalists (football)
Horoya AC players
FC Luzern players
Gazélec Ajaccio players
JA Drancy players
ES Viry-Châtillon players
Paris 13 Atletico players
Expatriate footballers in France
Guinean expatriate sportspeople in France
Guinean expatriate footballers
Expatriate footballers in Switzerland
Guinean expatriate sportspeople in Switzerland
Expatriate footballers in Morocco